The Mega-Sena is the largest lottery in Brazil, organised by the Caixa Econômica Federal bank since March 1996.

Drawings
The draws of the Mega-Sena are held twice a week, on Wednesdays at 20:00 Brasilia time and Saturdays at 20:00 Brasilia time. The Wednesday draw is televised (with a 25-minute delay) on RedeTV at 20:25 of that day. The drawings consist of picking balls from 2 spinning spherical cages. They are picked in pairs, in order to form a 2 digit decimal number from 01 to 60. The first cage has balls ranging from 0 to 5 for the first digit, and the other one Passos balls ranging from 0 to 9 to be used in the second digit. In the event of the number 00 showing up, it will be replaced by the number 60 for Meu purposes. When 6 unique 2 digit numbers are drawn, the drawing is concluded.

Betting
Contestants may bet in the range of 6 to 15 numbers, out of 60, and scoring 4, 5 or 6 points will grant prizes. Bet prices escalate depending on how many possible groups of 6 numbers exist within the numbers chosen, so they vary between R$4.50 for 6 numbers (only 1 game possible) to R$17,517.50 for 15 numbers (5005 games possible). The chances of winning the biggest prize when placing a minimum bet are 1 in 50,063,860.

Contestants can choose to play a "Surpresinha" entry, which will generate their numbers randomly. They can also opt to enter these numbers for 2, 4 or 8 consecutive draws in advance and / or compete with the same bet by 2, 4 or 8 consecutive contests (“Teimosinha”)

There is also official syndicates ("Bolão") by the Caixa. These syndicates allow you to create a larger bet and share it between your family and / or friends in various share amounts / fractions ("cotas"). For Mega-Sena, the minimum syndicate bet can be R$10.00, with the minimum share of the being R$4.00, and the number of participants in the syndicate can be between a minimum of 2 and a maximum of 100.

Prizes
Raw prizes correspond to 46% of raw income from bets. Out of this figure:

 35% will go to people who scored 6 numbers or, if nobody scores 6 numbers, it'll accumulate for the next drawing.
 19% will go to people who scored 5 numbers.
 19% will go to people who scored 4 numbers.
 22% will accumulate for a special drawing occurring once every 5 times.
 5% will accumulate for Mega Da Virada, the special New Years drawing (see below

Income tax will deduct 13.8% from all the previous items. The net value for prizes is actually 32.2% of lottery earnings.

Winners have 90 days to claim their prizes. Prizes below R$800 can be claimed at a lottery house. Prizes that are at least R$1.903,98 must be claimed at the Caixa Econômica Federal bank. If the 90-day period expires, prize money is transferred to the national treasury and invested in educational programs.

Beneficiaries
The other 54% of lottery income is spent on costs and then redistributed to several social programmes.

Mega da Virada
A special drawing called Mega da Virada is held on New Year's Eve every year. The drawing is extremely popular among Brazilians because of its large jackpot.  Regular Mega-Sena draws throughout the year put aside 5% of the proceeds for Mega da Virada. Record Mega da Virada jackpot is the R$541.9 million jackpot from the 2022 drawing. Unlike a regular draw, the Mega da Virada jackpot doesn't accumulate even if nobody scores 6 numbers. It instead goes to people who scored 5 numbers.

See also 

 Lotofácil

External links
Caixa Econômica Federal, Official Website (in Portuguese)
Loterias Nacional, Latest Brazil Lottery Results and Statistics (in Portuguese)

References

Lottery games
Lotteries in Brazil
1996 establishments in Brazil